Oops!... I Did It Again is the second studio album by American singer Britney Spears. It was released on May 3, 2000, by Jive Records.

Following the tremendous commercial success of her debut studio album ...Baby One More Time (1999) and the completion of its accompanying concert tour of the same title, Spears began recording material for her second studio album in September 1999. Pressured to duplicate the success of ...Baby One More Time, she collaborated with a wide range of producers, including Max Martin, Rami Yacoub, Per Magnusson, David Kreuger, Kristian Lundin, Jake Schulze, Darkchild, and Robert John "Mutt" Lange for Oops!... I Did It Again. The final result was a pop, dance-pop and teen pop record exceedingly in the vein of ...Baby One More Time, but incorporating funk and R&B. The production, sonic quality, and Spears' vocal performance received critical acclaim upon the album's release.

Much like its predecessor, Oops!... I Did It Again became a massive commercial success, debuting atop the US  Billboard 200, with first-week sales of 1.319 million copies, holding the record for the fastest-selling album by a female artist and the largest first-week sales for a female album for 15 years, until it was broken by Adele's 25 (2015), which sold over 3.38 million copies in its first week. In addition, Oops!... I Did It Again received a nomination for Best Pop Vocal Album at the 43rd Annual Grammy Awards (2001). It became Spears' second consecutive album to be certified diamond by the Recording Industry Association of America (RIAA), making Spears the youngest artist to have multiple diamond albums. With worldwide sales of over 20 million copies, it is one of the best-selling albums of all time.

Oops!... I Did It Again produced four singles. Its title track was a global commercial success, reaching number one in 15 countries and peaking at number nine on the US Billboard Hot 100. "Lucky" peaked within the top ten in 16 countries, but only at number 23 on the US Billboard Hot 100. "Stronger" peaked at number 11 on the US Billboard Hot 100 and became the best-selling single from the album. The final single "Don't Let Me Be the Last to Know" was moderately successful across Europe and failed to chart altogether in the United States. To promote the album, Spears performed on several television shows and award ceremonies, including a controversial performance at the 2000 MTV Video Music Awards, also hosting and performing for the first time on Saturday Night Live. Furthermore, she embarked on her third concert tour, entitled the Oops!... I Did It Again Tour (2000).

Recording and production

After vacationing for six days following the completion of the ...Baby One More Time Tour in September 1999, Spears returned to New York City to begin recording songs for her second studio album. Producers Max Martin, Eric Foster White, Diane Warren, Robert Lange, Steve Lunt, and Babyface made contributions to the album. "Where Are You Now" and bonus track "You Got It All"–a cover of the Jets' 1986 song of the same title–were outtakes from the recording sessions for ...Baby One More Time. The songs "Oops!... I Did It Again", "Walk on By", "What U See (Is What U Get)", and "Don't Go Knockin' on My Door" were recorded at Martin's Cheiron Studios within the first week of November. Spears recorded "Don't Let Me Be the Last to Know" at Lange's villa in Switzerland in December 1999; Lange produced the song. "Stronger" and "Lucky" soon followed, and were finalized along with the title track in January 2000.

By January, the then-untitled Oops!... I Did It Again was halfway to completion. Instrumental tracks and melodies of "Girl in the Mirror" and "Can't Make You Love Me" had been recorded in the fall of 1999 in Sweden, with Spears recording the vocals in mid-January at the Parc Studios in Orlando, Florida. After recording internationally, Spears returned to New York City, linking up with producer Steve Lunt to record Diane Warren's "When Your Eyes Say It" at the Battery Studios on January 28, which preceded her Total Request Live appearance that day. "One Kiss from You" was also recorded at the Battery Studios, later being finished at 3rd Floor in New York City. Spears also recorded "Dear Diary", which would later be completed at East Bay Recording in Tarrytown, New York and at the Avatar Studios in New York City. Spears' cover of "(I Can't Get No) Satisfaction" was recorded with Rodney Jerkins at the Pacifique Recording Studios in Los Angeles during February 24–26, 2000, after the 42nd Annual Grammy Awards.

Spears was heavily pressured to repeat the tremendous commercial success of ...Baby One More Time, stating: "It's kind of hard following ten million, I have to say. But after listening to the new material and recording it, I'm really confident with it." Upon the album's release, Spears said: "I mean, of course there's some pressure", and added: "But in my opinion, [Oops!] is a lot better than the first album. It's edgier – it has more of an attitude. It's more me, and I think teenagers will relate to it more." Geoff Mayfield, director of the Billboard charts, added that the decision to release Oops!... I Did It Again less than a year and a half after Spears' debut amounts to "very smart timing. My philosophy is when you have a young fan base, get 'em while they're hot."

Music and lyrics
Oops!... I Did It Again was considered the sequel to ...Baby One More Time, percolating with a carefully measured blend of pop, funk, R&B and power balladry. Spears said in an interview that the album showcased a more mature, R&B-flavored pop sound. "It's not something I changed purposefully", Spears said of the album's sound and added: "It's just something that kind of changed on itself with me being older. My voice has changed a little bit and I'm more confident, and I think that comes across on the material." Rodney "Darkchild" Jerkins talked about working with Spears on the cover of the Rolling Stones' "(I Can't Get No) Satisfaction", stating: "It's going to shock everybody. It has flavors of the original, but it's a straight 2000 version — new to the ear. Which I think is cool, because people who appreciate that song are going to love it. And I made it so new and young that the young kids that love Britney are going to love it. It's going to grab both a mature and young audience." Spears worked with Robert "Mutt" Lange on "Don't Let Me Be the Last to Know", telling MTV News: "When you hear the song, it's so pure and delicate. It's just one of those songs that pull you in", and added: "I think they wrote it 'specially for me, because the lyrics of the song, if you really listen … they're more of what I can relate to, 'cause they're kind of young lyrics, I think. I don't think Shania would probably sing some of the words that I'm saying."

Oops!... I Did It Again opens with its title track, which was compared to her debut single, "...Baby One More Time" (1998), featuring a slap-and-pop bassline, synthesizer chord stabs and a mechanized beat. Lyrically, the song sees Spears warning to an overeager prospective lover: "Oops, you think I'm in love / That I'm sent from above / I'm not that innocent." The song also breaks down for a spoken-word interlude, involving a line from the film Titanic (1997). The second track "Stronger" is a synthpop and R&B-infused track, which is lyrically a declaration of independence, seeing Spears leaving a partner who treats her as property. The line "my loneliness ain't killing me no more" makes reference to the verse "my loneliness is killing me" from her debut single "...Baby One More Time". Another R&B-infused track which also incorporates funk, "Don't Go Knocking on My Door" finds Spears confidently forging ahead after a breakup. "(I Can't Get No) Satisfaction" begins with mushy guitar plucking and breathy coos, until a dry, crackling lockstep is thrown down, turning the song into an urban stomp. The dance-pop cover also jettisons the song's final verse and adds new lyrics (i.e. "how white my shirts could be" becomes "how tight my skirt should be"). "[It] was my idea [to record the song]", Spears said, adding: "I was just like, 'I like this song,' and I think it will be a really cool combination working with [Jerkins] and doing a really funky song like that."

The fifth track "Don't Let Me Be the Last to Know" was co-written by country pop singer-songwriter Shania Twain and her then-husband Lange, who also produced the track. The ballad, which boasts a slinky keyboard riff and Lange's characteristically lavish production, finds Spears allowing a bit of "country twang" into her vocals as she begs a lover to reveal his feelings: "My friends say you're into me ... but I need to hear it straight from you". "What U See (Is What U Get)" demands respect by rebuking a jealous partner, while "Lucky" is a heart-rending tale of a Hollywood starlet's loneliness, proving that fame can be empty: "If there's nothing missing in my life/Then why do these tears come at night?". "School crush" is the lyrical theme of "One Kiss from You", a track with a reggae-style beat and lyrics about the feelings of falling in love and the quickness of it, with Spears cooing that after only one kiss she sees her entire future with her lover. The ballad "Where Are You Now" talks about wanting to know where a former lover is and what they have been up to, so that the protagonist can finally let them go and find closure. Lines on the Europop track "Can't Make You Love Me" state that fancy cars and money pale in comparison to true love, with Spears singing: "I'm just a girl with a crush on you." The mid-tempo, synth-backed "When Your Eyes Say It", written by songwriter Diane Warren, combines a string section with a loping hip hop beat, while Spears makes her own songwriting debut on the modest, keyboard-driven ballad "Dear Diary", which she said was autobiographical. On the track, she sings about wanting to become "so much more than friends" with a boy.

Release and promotion

In late 1999, Spears promoted then-upcoming Oops!... I Did It Again in Europe, appearing on Smash Hits in the United Kingdom. In Italy, she did a short interview on the television show TRL Italy in early 2000. In Australia, Spears appeared on Russell Gilbert Live and The House of Hits. In the United States, Spears embarked on her (You Drive Me) Crazy Tour on March 8; the tour ended with a free concert in Honolulu, Hawaii on April 24, which aired on Fox as a television special titled Britney Spears in Hawaii. In Japan, Spears had a press event at Kokusai Forum Hall in Tokyo on May 2, and Oops!... I Did It Again was released the following day. Spears gave a surprise performance in Paris on May 6. In the US, Spears was interviewed on Late Night with Conan O'Brien on May 10, hosted and performed on Saturday Night Live on May 13, and appeared on The Rosie O'Donnell Show on May 15. On May 14, she appeared at MTV's Times Square studios for two hours of "Britney Live", and held her post-Total Request Live listening party titled "Britney's First Listen" on May 16, the day Oops!... I Did It Again was released in the US. She also performed on The Tonight Show with Jay Leno on May 23, and appeared on [[People (magazine)#Teen People|Teen People'''s 25 Under 25]] on May 26.

To further promote Oops!... I Did It Again, Spears embarked on the Oops!... I Did It Again Tour. It was scheduled to begin on June 15 but started five days later, visiting North America during the summer and Europe during the fall, hence becoming Spears's first European tour. On June 24, Spears was featured in a print and television advertising campaign for Clairol's Herbal Essences shampoo line. In a special coup for Clairol, Spears recorded her own song for the brand, titled "I've Got the Urge to Herbal", which was featured in 60-second radio spots and was part of a pre-concert video presentation for the tour, which Herbal Essences sponsored. During the tour, Spears continued with televised appearances and performances to promote the album. She performed "Oops!... I Did It Again" and "Lucky" on MTV's All Access: Backstage with Britney, which aired on July 19. On September 7, at the 2000 MTV Video Music Awards in New York City at the Radio City Music Hall, Spears gave a memorable live performance, which included a cover of the Rolling Stones's hit single "(I Can't Get No) Satisfaction" (1965) and her own "Oops!... I Did It Again". While she began her segment in a black suit, she shocked the audience and the media by ripping it off to display a revealing, skin-colored stage outfit with hundreds of strategically placed Swarovski crystals. In Spain, she was interviewed on El Rayo, which aired on September 8. She performed "Stronger" at the Radio Music Awards on November 4, at the M6 Awards on November 17, and the American Music Awards of 2001 on January 8, 2001. She performed at Rock in Rio in Brazil on January 18, sharing the stage with headliners NSYNC.

Singles
According to Billboard, Oops!... I Did It Again is one of the 15 best-performing 21st-century albums without any of its singles being number-one hits on the US Billboard Hot 100 as of 2022; its only top-ten hit was its 
lead single "Oops!... I Did It Again, which reached number nine. In comparison to the huge success of her debut single "...Baby One More Time", Jive Records considered "Oops!... I Did It Again" a minor disappointment. The song peaked atop the US Mainstream Top 40, holding the record for the most radio additions in one day. "Oops!... I Did It Again" peaked atop the charts in Australia, Belgium, Canada, Italy, the Netherlands, New Zealand, Norway, Poland, Romania, Spain, Sweden, Switzerland and the United Kingdom. An accompanying music video for "Oops!... I Did It Again" saw Spears on Mars in a now-iconic red shiny catsuit, while she is visited by an American astronaut who hands her the fictional Heart of the Ocean jewel, which Rose threw into the sea at the end of Titanic (1997).

"Lucky" was released as the second single from Oops!... I Did It Again on July 25, 2000 to a positive response from the music critics, who considered it one of the album's best offerings. Commercially, "Lucky" topped the charts in Austria, Germany, Sweden and Switzerland, while reaching number five on the UK Singles Chart. In the United States, "Lucky" only managed to peak at number 23 on the Billboard Hot 100 and at number nine on the Mainstream Top 40. Its "glittery" accompanying music video sees Spears as both the narrator and an actress named Lucky, who is a melancholy movie star and shows her conflicted relationship to fame.
 
"Stronger" was released as the third single from Oops!... I Did It Again on October 31, 2000. It became the album's second highest-charting single in the US, peaking at number 11 on the Billboard Hot 100 and atop the Hot Singles Sales. It reached number seven on the UK Singles Chart. Its accompanying music video sees Spears catching her boyfriend cheating on her at a futuristic turntable nightclub, then driving off, getting in a wreck and singing in the rain, while the chair sequence in the video was inspired by Janet Jackson's music video for "The Pleasure Principle".

"Don't Let Me Be the Last to Know" was released as the fourth and final single from Oops!... I Did It Again on March 12, 2001. In the US, the song performed below expectations, failing to chart on any of the Billboard charts. However, the song attained success in Europe, peaking atop the Romanian Top 100 and within the top ten in Austria, Poland and Switzerland, while just missing the top ten in Germany, Ireland, Sweden and the United Kingdom, peaking at number 12 in all of them. The accompanying music video was considered too racy at the time, portraying Spears in love scenes with her fictional boyfriend, played by French model Brice Durand.

Critical receptionOops!... I Did It Again received favorable reviews from music critics. At Metacritic, which assigns a normalized rating out of 100 to reviews from mainstream critics, Oops!... I Did It Again received an average score of 72, based on 12 reviews, indicating "generally favorable reviews". Giving the album four out of five stars, Stephen Thomas Erlewine of AllMusic noted that the album "has the same combination of sweetly sentimental ballads and endearingly gaudy dance-pop that made 'One More Time'," but remarked that, "Fortunately, she and her production team not only have a stronger overall set of songs this time, but they also occasionally get carried away with the same bewildering magpie aesthetic, [...] giv[ing] the album character apart from the well-crafted dance-pop and ballads that serve as its heart. In the end, it's what makes this an entertaining, satisfying listen." Billboard magazine wrote that "'Oops!...' indicates that she's developing a soulful edge and emotional depth that can't be conjured with a glass-shattering note," praising the album for consistently cast[ing] Spears as a young woman coming to terms with her inner power—and that's a darn good message to offer an impressionable audience." Entertainment Weeklys David Browne gave the album a B-rating, writing that the album "reminds us once again that the best new pop can be a blast of cool air in a stifling room."

Rob Sheffield of Rolling Stone gave the album a three-and-a-half out of five stars rating, calling the album "fantastic pop cheese, with much better song-factory hooks than 'N Sync or BSB get", also noting that "the great thing about Oops!, under the cheese surface, is complex, fierce and downright scary, making her a true child of rock & roll tradition." A writer of NME reported that "she's modern-day pop perfection realised in a nearly, human form", commenting that "she's done it again." Lennat Mak of MTV Asia named it "a brilliant second album", writing that Spears "is armed with a more mature and seasoned pop star look, stronger and poppier songs, and of course, extensive media exposure." Andy Battaglia of Salon called the album "a masterpiece of sorts not for its message but for the way it applies the conventions of the pop-musical medium." Website The A.V. Club was more mixed, calling it "a joyless bit of redundant, obvious, competent cheese, recycling itself at every turn and soliciting songwriting from such soulless hacks as Diane Warren and assorted Swedes."

Accolades

|-
! scope="row" rowspan="2"| 2000
| rowspan="2"| Billboard Music Award
| Biggest One-Week Sales of an Album Ever by a Female Artist
| rowspan="2"| Britney Spears
| 
| align="center"| 
|-
| Albums Artist of the Year
| 
| align="center"| 
|-
! scope="row"| 2001
| American Music Award
| Favorite Pop/Rock Album
| rowspan="3"| Oops!... I Did It Again
| 
| align="center"| 
|-
! scope="row"| 2001
| Grammy Award
| Best Pop Vocal Album
| 
| align="center"| 
|-
! scope="row"| 2001
| Juno Award
| Best Selling Album (Foreign or Domestic)
| 
| align="center"| 
|}

Commercial performance
In the United States, Oops!... I Did It Again reportedly sold 500,000 copies in its first day of release. It debuted at number one on the Billboard 200 chart, with first-week sales of 1,319,193 copies, becoming the fastest-selling album by a female artist since Nielsen SoundScan began tracking point-of-sale music purchases in 1991. With its success, Spears held the record for the highest first-week sales by a female artist. This record was held for 15 years, only to be surpassed in November 2015 by the album 25 by Adele, which sold over 3.38 million albums in the United States in its first week. The album fell to number two in its second week, with additional sales of 612,000 copies. It held this position for fifteen consecutive weeks. By its fifth week of availability, Oops!... I Did It Again had sold over three million copies and had passed five million copies by August. On its seventeenth week on the chart, it was certified septuple Platinum by the Recording Industry Association of America (RIAA) for shipments of seven million units. The album spent eighty-four weeks on the Billboard 200, thirty-one weeks on the Canadian Albums Chart, and two weeks on the US Catalog Albums. Oops!... I Did It Again debuted at number eighty-two on the European Top 100 Albums, and quickly peaked at number one; it sold over four million copies within the continent, being certified four-times Platinum by the International Federation of the Phonographic Industry. Oops!... I Did It Again reached number two on the UK Albums Chart, selling 88,000 copies in the first week of release; it remained in the top five for four weeks. The album debuted at number one in Canada, selling 95,275 copies in its first week.

It topped the French Albums Chart and the German Offizielle Top 100, also being certified triple Platinum by the British Phonographic Industry (BPI), double Gold by the Syndicat National de l'Édition Phonographique (SNEP) and triple Platinum by Bundesverband Musikindustrie (BVMI), denoting shipments to retailers of 900,000 units, 200,000 copies sold and 900,000 units shipped, respectively. Additionally, the album debuted at number two on the Australian Albums Chart, and spent ten weeks in the top twenty; it became the fourteenth highest-selling of 2000 in the country and was certified double Platinum by the Australian Recording Industry Association (ARIA) the following year after shipping 140,000 copies to retailers. Oops!... I Did It Again opened at number three on the New Zealand Albums Chart and was certified Gold after just one week on the chart. The Recording Industry Association of New Zealand (RIANZ) ultimately certified it double Platinum. Oops!... I Did It Again became the third best-selling album of 2000 in the United States, selling 7,893,544 albums according to Nielsen SoundScan and fourth best-selling album according to Billboard Year-End of 2000. On January 24, 2005, the album was certified decuple Platinum (Diamond) by the Recording Industry Association of America (RIAA). Also, the album landed at number twenty-seven on BMG Music Club all-time best-sellers list with 1.21 million units, behind Shania Twain's The Woman in Me (1.24 million) and Nirvana's Nevermind (1.24 million). As of July 2009, the album has sold 9,184,000 copies in the United States, excluded copies sold through clubs, such as the BMG Music Service.
Worldwide, Oops!... I Did It Again sold 2.5 million copies in its first week (second highest first week sales by a female artist worldwide) and sold 15 million copies by the end of the year. It was the best-selling female album and 3rd best selling album of 2000. The album has sold 20 million copies worldwide.

Controversy
Musicians Michael Cottril and Lawrence Wnukowski filed a copyright case against Spears, Zomba Recording Corporation, Jive Records, Wright Entertainment Group and BMG Music Publishing, claiming Spears' "What U See (Is What U Get)" and "Can't Make You Love Me" are "virtually identical" to one of their songs. Cottrill and Wnukowski claimed that they authored, recorded and copyrighted a song called "What You See Is What You Get" in 1999 to one of Spears' representatives for consideration on a future album, though it was rejected. The case was later dismissed after it was ruled that they lacked sufficient evidence and that there "weren't enough similarities between the two songs to prove copyright infringement."

Track listingNotes'  signifies a vocal producer
 "(I Can't Get No) Satisfaction" is a cover of the 1965 song of the same title by the Rolling Stones.

Personnel
Credits are adapted from the liner notes of Oops!... I Did It Again''.

 Gloria Agostini – harp
 Amahid Ajemian – violin
 Sanford Allen – violin
 Timmy Allen – production
 John Amatiello – engineering
 Therese Ancker – backing vocals
 Darryl Anthony – backing vocals
 Stephanie Baer – backing vocals, viola
 Julien Barber – viola
 Sandra Billingslea – violin
 Charlotte Björkman – backing vocals
 Elan Bongiorno – make-up
 Alfred Bosco – engineering assistance
 Alfred V. Brown – orchestral contracting, viola
 Bobby Brown – engineering assistance
 Larry "Rock" Campbell – bass, drum programming, guitar, production
 Johan Carlberg – guitar
 Cory Churko – programming
 Kevin Churko – programming
 Tom Coyne – mastering
 Marji Danilow – bass
 Tim Donovan – engineering
 Barry J. Eastmond – conducting, engineering, keyboards, orchestral arrangement, piano, production
 Michel Gallone – engineering, mixing engineering
 Winterton Garvey – violin
 Eric Gast – engineering
 Dan Gellert – engineering
 Stephen George – mixing engineering
 Nigel Green – mixing
 Nikki Gregoroff – backing vocals
 Joyce Hammann – violin
 Nana Hedin – backing vocals
 Richard Henrickson – concertmastering, violin
 Hayley Hill – styling
 Ashley Horne – violin
 Stanley Hunte – violin
 Regis Iandiorio – violin
 Jake – keyboards, mixing engineering, production, programming
 Robert "Esmail" Jazayeri – drum programming, keyboards, production
 Rodney Jerkins – engineering, mixing engineering, production, vocal arrangement
 Kali – hair styling
 Olivia Koppell – viola
 David Kreuger – keyboards, mixing engineering, production, programming 
 Robert John "Mutt" Lange – production
 Jeanne LeBlanc – cello
 Jesse Levy – cello
 Thomas Lindberg – bass
 Kristian Lundin – keyboards, mixing engineering, production, programming
 Steve Lunt – A&R, production, songwriting, string arrangements
 Margaret Magill – violin
 Per Magnusson – keyboards, mixing engineering, production, programming
 Audrey Martells – backing vocals
 Max Martin – keyboards, mixing engineering, production, programming, vocals
 Harvey Mason, Jr. – engineering
 Harvey Mason, Sr. – editing
 Charles McCrorey – engineering, engineering assistance
 William Meade – string coordination
 Richard Meyer – programming
 Kermit Moore – cello
 Eugene J. Moye – cello
 Jackie Murphy – art direction, design
 Esbjörn Öhrwall – guitar
 Jeanette Olsson – backing vocals
 Gene Orloff – violin
 Flip Osman – engineering assistance
 Nora Payne – backing vocals
 Marion Pinhiero – violin
 Jon Ragel – photography
 Rami – keyboards, mixing engineering, production, programming 
 Maxine Roach – viola
 Anthony Ruotolo – engineering assistance
 Mark Seliger – photography
 Dexter Simmons – mixing engineering
 Jeanette Söderholm – backing vocals
 Britney Spears – conceptualization, songwriting, vocals
 Shane Stoneback – engineering assistance
 Judith Sugarman – bass
 Marti Sweet – violin
 Gerald Tarack – violin
 Chris Tergesen – string engineering
 Michael Thompson – guitar
 Chris Trevett – engineering, mixing engineering, vocal engineering
 Michael Tucker – vocal engineering
 Andres Von Hofsten – backing vocals
 Belinda Whitney-Barratt – violin
 Clayton Wood – engineering assistance
 Kent Wood – keyboards
 Nina Woodford – backing vocals
 Johnny Wright – management
 Mona Yacoub – backing vocals
 Harry Zaratzian – viola
 Xin Zhao – violin

Charts

Weekly charts

Monthly charts

Year-end charts

Decade-end charts

All-time charts

Certifications and sales

Release history

See also
 Teen pop
 Britney Spears discography
 List of Billboard 200 number-one albums of 2000
 List of number-one albums of 2000 (Canada)
 List of number-one albums of 2000 (Germany)
 List of number-one albums of 2000 (Portugal)
 List of Oricon number-one albums of 2000
 List of best-selling albums
 List of best-selling albums by women
 List of best-selling albums in the United States
 List of fastest-selling albums

Notes

References

Bibliography

External links
 Official website
 
 Oops!... I Did It Again at Metacritic

2000 albums
Britney Spears albums
Jive Records albums
Albums involved in plagiarism controversies
Albums produced by Rodney Jerkins
Albums produced by Max Martin
Albums produced by Rami Yacoub
Albums produced by Robert John "Mutt" Lange
Albums recorded at Cheiron Studios
Albums recorded at Electric Lady Studios